Acacia hopperiana is a small tree or shrub belonging to the genus Acacia and the subgenus Juliflorae that is endemic to western Australia.

It often has a dense habit with red-brown coloured glabrous branchlets that are silvery between the fine ribs. The phyllodes are sub-rigid and straight to shallowly incurved with ten longitudinal nerves of uniform width which are each separated by a narrow dark longitudinal furrow. It blooms in August producing yellow flowers. The greyish-brown coloured pods are flat and constricted between seeds and straight to shallowly curved.

It is closely related to Acacia isoneura.

It is native to an area in the Mid West and northern Wheatbelt region of Western Australia where it is found amongst dense shrubland on sandplains, or swales or sand dunes growing in sandy It has a disjunct distribution between Carnamah and Watheroo in the south to near Buntine Rock in the east a little to the north of the Murchison River.

See also
List of Acacia species

References

hopperiana
Acacias of Western Australia
Plants described in 1999
Taxa named by Bruce Maslin